Xenothictis paragona is a species of moth of the family Tortricidae. It is found on the Loyalty Islands in the south-west Pacific.

References

	

Moths described in 1910
Archipini
Taxa named by Edward Meyrick